The 2021–22 Guadeloupe Division of Honor season is the 71st season of the league. The defending champions, AS Gosier, are vying in Group B for their 3rd title and their 3rd consecutive one.

League table

Group A

Group B

References 

Guadeloupe Division of Honor
2021–22 in Caribbean football leagues
2021 in Guadeloupean sport
2021 in Guadeloupe